Nikki Pradhan (born 8 December 1993) is an Indian professional field hockey player and is a member of the Indian national team. Pradhan was the first female Hockey player from Jharkhand who represented India in the Olympics. Pradhan was included in a 16-member squad for Rio Olympics, which also marked the return of Indian women's hockey to the Olympics after 36 years after a stellar show at the Hockey World League Semifinals in 2015. Pradhan was the midfielder of the Indian Women's Hockey team. Her selection to the team made her the sixth hockey player from Jharkhand to play in Olympics, bracketing her with Jaipal Singh Munda (1928), Michael Kido (1972), Sylvanus Dungdung (1980), Ajeet Lakra (1992) and Manohar Topno (1984).

Early life
Pradhan was born in Hesel village in tribal heartland Khunti, roughly 60 kilometres from Ranchi, Jharkhand, on 8 December 1993, to Soma Pradhan, a Bihar police constable, and his wife, Jitan Devi, a homemaker. Pradhan is the third daughter of Soma Pradhan and Jitan Devi. She belongs to Kharwar Bhogta community.

Pradhan studied at Pilaul Middle School and started playing the game at a young age under the guidance of her childhood coach Dasrath Mahto. She was inspired by Pushpa Pradhan, who visited school in 1999 and tell her journey to national hockey team. Then she made hockey stick of bamboo and started to play. Later she enrolled in the Bariatu Girls' Hockey Center in Ranchi in 2005, which has produced former Indian captain Asunta Lakra. She leave sport hostel in 2009. After passing 12th class in 2010, she had to leave hostel but she was allowed to stay in hostel and play in campus due to request. After playing Jharkhand National Games in 2011, she got selected for national camp in 2012.

Career
Pradhan played the first time for India in U-17 Asia Cup in Bangkok in 2011. However, Pradhan wasn't able to get selected for the India's Junior National Hockey Camp in 2011–2012. Pradhan was also a part of the U-21 Women's Hockey Team which won the silver medal in the Asia Cup, however, had to stay out of action due to an injury until the beginning of 2015. Pradhan made her debut for the Senior Indian Team and was called into the senior camp in August 2015.

Pradhan was later selected as a member of the squad of Indian Women's Hockey team, which represented India in Rio Olympics in Brazil in 2016. Her selection to the Indian Women's Hockey team that represented India in Olympics scripted history as she was the first woman Hockey player from Jharkhand to ever play in Olympics. The 16-member team was led by defender Sushila Chanu. Pradhan played at the position of a midfielder, alongside Renuka Yadav, Llima Minz, Monika and Navjot Kaur. The other team members were Deep Grace Ekka, Anuradha Devi Thokchom, Savita, Poonam Rani, Vandana Katariya, Deepika, Namita Toppo, Sunita Lakra and Preeti Dubey. The team, however, got eliminated in the group stage where they were placed 6th.

In 2022 Commonwealth Games, Indian women hockey team won bronze medal. The team won a medal in common wealth games after 16 years.

References

External links

Nikki Pradhan at Hockey India

Indian female field hockey players
Living people
1993 births
Olympic field hockey players of India
Field hockey players at the 2016 Summer Olympics
Field hockey players at the 2020 Summer Olympics
People from Khunti district
Sportswomen from Jharkhand
Field hockey players from Jharkhand
21st-century Indian women
21st-century Indian people
Female field hockey midfielders
Field hockey players at the 2018 Asian Games
Asian Games silver medalists for India
Asian Games medalists in field hockey
Medalists at the 2018 Asian Games
Field hockey players at the 2018 Commonwealth Games
Field hockey players at the 2022 Commonwealth Games
Commonwealth Games bronze medallists for India
Commonwealth Games medallists in field hockey
Nagpuria people
Medallists at the 2022 Commonwealth Games